Sena is a state constituency in Perlis, Malaysia, that has been represented in the Perlis State Legislative Assembly from 1959 to 1974 and from 1986 to present.

The state constituency was created in 1958. It was first contested in 1959 and is mandated to return a single Assemblyman to the Perlis State Legislative Assembly under the first-past-the-post voting system. , the State Assemblyman for Sena is Asrul Nizan Abd Jalil from Pakatan Harapan (PH).

Definition

Polling districts 
According to the federal gazette issued on 31 October 2022, the Sena constituency is divided into 7 polling districts.

Demographics

History
The seat was abolished in 1974 when it was redistributed between Oran and Paya. It was re-created in 1984 from parts of Oran and Paya.

Election results

References

Perlis state constituencies